Etching is a printmaking technique in art.

Etching may also refer to:

 Etching (microfabrication), a process in producing microelectronics
 Glass etching, a glass decoration technique
 Chemical milling, or industrial etching
 Photochemical machining, or photo etching
 Photoengraving, an engraving process

See also

 Eching (disambiguation)
 Etch (disambiguation)
 Chemical weathering of rocks
 Dishwasher#Silicate filming, etching, and accelerated crack corrosion
 Etcher (software), a utility used for writing image files
 Ion track, in chemical etching
 Photoresist, a light-sensitive material used in several processes